In poetry, a fourteener is a line consisting of 14 syllables, which are usually made of seven iambic feet, for which the style is also called iambic heptameter. It is most commonly found in English poetry produced in the 16th and 17th centuries. Fourteeners often appear as rhymed couplets, in which case they may be seen as ballad stanza or common metre hymn quatrains in two rather than four lines.

The term may also be used as a synonym for quatorzain, a 14-line poem, such as a sonnet.

Background

Poulter's measure is a meter consisting of alternate Alexandrines combined with Fourteeners, to form a poem of  12 and 14 syllable lines. It was often used in the Elizabethan era. The term was coined by George Gascoigne, because poulters, or poulterers (sellers of poultry), would sometimes give 12 to the dozen, and other times 14 (see also Baker's dozen). When the poulter's measure couplet is divided at its caesurae, it becomes a short measure stanza, a quatrain of 3, 3, 4, and 3 feet. Examples of this form are Nicholas Grimald's A Truelove; Lord Brooke's Epitaph on Sir Phillip Sydney; Nicholas Breton's Phyllis in the Oxford Book of Sixteenth Century Verse.

In the early 17th century, George Chapman famously used the fourteener when he produced one of the first English translations of Homer's Iliad. Two centuries later, in his "On First Looking into Chapman's Homer," John Keats expressed his appreciation for what he called the "loud and bold" quality of Chapman's translation, which he implicitly contrasted with the more prestigious but more tightly controlled heroic couplets of Alexander Pope's 18th-century translation, thereby using one type of fourteener (a sonnet) to comment on the other (iambic heptameter).

Samuel Johnson in his Lives of The English Poets comments upon the importance of fourteeners to later English lyric forms saying "as these lines had their caesura always at the eighth syllable, it was thought in time commodious to divide them; and quatrains of lines alternately consisting of eight and six syllables make the most soft and pleasing of our lyric measures".  These quatrains of eight and six syllables (or more loosely, lines of 4, 3, 4, and 3 beats) are known as common meter.

C. S. Lewis, in his English Literature in the Sixteenth Century, castigates the 'lumbering' poulter's measure (p. 109). He attributes the introduction of this 'terrible' meter to Thomas Wyatt (p. 224). In a more extended analysis (pp. 231–2), he comments:

The medial break in the alexandrine, though it may do well enough in French, becomes intolerable in a language with such a tyrannous stress-accent as ours: the line struts. The fourteener has a much pleasanter movement, but a totally different one: the line dances a jig.

The poets Surrey, Tuberville, Gascoigne, Balassone, Golding and others all used the Poulter's Measure, the rhyming fourteener with authority.

Illustrations 

William Blake used lines of fourteen syllables, for example in The Book of Thel.  These lines, however, are not written in iambic heptameter.

Four of the poems included by J.R.R. Tolkien in The Lord of the Rings are written in fourteeners: "Galadriel's Song of Eldamar," in the chapter "Farewell to Lórien"; the "Lament for Boromir" in the chapter "The Departure of Boromir"; and two in the chapter "Treebeard" -- Treebeard's song of "The Ent and the Entwife"; and the lament of the Ent Quickbeam for his rowan trees. The last of these features internal rhyme.

Queen Marina of the video game Dragon Quest XI speaks exclusively in fourteeners. 

The Gravemind from the Halo Trilogy speaks in acephalous fourteeners:

The seventh song of Philip Sidney's Astrophel and Stella is written in rhyming fourteener couplets:

Sidney's friend, the translator Arthur Golding, was extremely fond of fourteeners:

The theme to Gilligan's Island is largely composed in iambic heptameter:

The children’s book Giraffes Can’t Dance by Giles Andreae is entirely composed in iambic heptameter:

Graeme Base's The Sign of the Seahorse is entirely in iambic heptameter, the first lines being:

Ernest Thayer's popular "Casey at the Bat" (1888):

Robert Southwell's most famous poem "The Burning Babe" is in rhyming fourteeners:

 A Tribe Called Quest's song "Lyrics to Go" is constructed largely around fourteeners:

Poulter's measure
 Henry Howard, Earl of Surrey's "Complaint of the Absence of her lover, being upon the sea" (1547) is in Poulter's measure:

References

External links
Examples of Poulter's Measure of Thomas Wyatt and others 

Poetic rhythm
Sonnet studies